A Cry for Help: The Tracey Thurman Story is a 1989 American made-for-television drama film based on the 1985 ruling Thurman v. City of Torrington. The film stars Nancy McKeon as Tracey; Dale Midkiff as Buck; and Bruce Weitz as Tracey's lawyer, Burton Weinstein.

Plot 
The movie opens with Tracey Thurman being rushed to the hospital after being physically assaulted by her estranged husband, Buck.

An extended flashback shows how Tracey and Buck met. Tracey was working in a hotel in Florida and came across Buck and his fellow construction workers. At first, Buck was a charming person, until, over time, he started to display raging tempers, even taking them all out on Tracey, telling her all about how his mother abused him as a child. Despite the violent outbursts, she agrees not to leave him. When she tells him that she is pregnant with his child, he punched her in the face and kicked her in the stomach. She then returns to Torrington, Connecticut, to be with her friends, Judy and Rick. Buck finds her and seemingly humbly apologizes for his behavior. He asked to marry her and promised to settle down in Connecticut. Tracey is hesitant, but when Buck promises never to hit her again, she agrees. After they got married, she gives birth to a boy, C.J.

Buck has no luck finding a job, so the family have no choice but to return to Florida. Over the next year, Buck manages to gamble away all their money, and continues to assault her, even in front of C.J. Tracey left him and returned to Torrington. The night after Tracey left for Torrington, Buck hopped in his pickup truck and drove all the way up to Torrington and hoped to surprise her while welcoming himself into the home she was staying at and told her that he found a job at a diner, but she didn't care. Tracey tells him to just stay away from her and grabs the phone, and he grabs their son C.J. and runs outae, Tracey calls the police where they find Buck feeding his son at work and have him clock out to take him into custody. The police said that she could have her son back if she and Buck reunite. Tracey decides to divorce Buck, and was given custody of her son without Buck seeing him for the time being. As she left, Buck attacks her in her own car. Buck is arrested, and Tracey issues a restraining order against him, but he continues to harass and threaten to kill her. Tracey goes to the police, but they did very little to help.

After the divorce is finalized, he shows up again, causing Tracey to call the police hoping that when they see him threatening her, they will arrest him. Buck demands Tracey to come out immediately, and when he stated that he wanted them back together, she refused to stop the divorce. When the police show up, Buck pulls out a knife and stabs her numerous times. He goes into the house and grabs C.J., showing him his injured mother lying on the ground in a pool of blood. Many neighbors witness Buck still assaulting Tracey, and yet the police fail to intervene. It wasn't until after Tracey was loaded in the ambulance that Buck was finally apprehended.

In the hospital, Tracey's lawyer, Burton Weinstein, together with Tracey's sister, discuss filing a civil lawsuit against the Torrington police department for not protecting her. Tracey spent months recuperating, and Buck is sentenced to 20 years in prison with the possibility of parole in 1991. Tracey is apprehensive about the possibility of his parole, knowing that upon his release, he would be coming after her. However, Weinstein is able to keep Tracey focused on the lawsuit. Following the civil suit trial, the jury rules in favor of Tracey, finding that her rights were violated, and she is awarded $2,300,000. She is also granted a permanent restraining order against Buck and he will not be allowed to contact C.J. or Tracey for the rest of their lives. Happy with the decision, she hugs Weinstein. In real life, Tracey was remarried to Michael Motuzick; Michael was granted permission to adopt C.J. so the family could build their lives together.

Cast
 Nancy McKeon as Tracey Thurman
 Dale Midkiff as Charles "Buck" Thurman
 Graham Jarvis as Officer Danziger
 Yvette Heyden as Judy Bentley
 Terri Hanauer as Cheryl
 Philip Baker Hall as Judge Blumenfeld
 David Wohl as Nagel
 David Ciminello as Rick Bentley
 Priscilla Pointer as Tracey's Mother
 Seth Isler as Lewis
 Burton Collins 
 Bruce Weitz as Burton Weinstein 
 David Wells as Minister
 Lee Ryan as Officer Avery
 Don Stark as Officer Driscoll
 Hank Woessner as Joe
 Todd Bryant as Card
 John Hertzler as Doctor
 Paul Comi as Officer Dempsey
 Joe George as Captain Kyker
 Redman Gleeson as Officer Bray
 Alan Haufrecht as Officer Cooper
 William Long Jr. as Sergeant Cherney
 Madison Mason as Officer Jones
 Raymond O'Keefe as Sergeant Smith
 Al Pugliese as Sergeant Kangas
 Charles Richards as Officer Davis
 David Hooks as Judge #1
 Richard Balin as Judge #2

References

External links

1989 television films
1989 films
1989 crime drama films
Drama films based on actual events
Torrington, Connecticut
Films set in Connecticut
Films about domestic violence
Films directed by Robert Markowitz
NBC network original films
American drama television films
1980s American films